Manohar Mouli Biswas is the pseudo-name of Manohar Biswas, a popular and most likely the best known bilingual poet, essayist and writer of Dalit Literature from Bengal.

Life and career

Manohar Mouli Biswas was born into Namasudra caste at Dakshin Matiargati, Khulna in East Bengal (erstwhile undivided Bengal in British India) in 1943. Having suffered from dire poverty since his childhood he struggled and beaten up all the obstacles in his route and became educated and finally established himself as an acclaimed Dalit writer in India. None of his forefathers had the privilege of going to school. He saw the pains suffered by his illiterate masses and the humiliation faced by them. He has no shame to acknowledge that he is a first generation learner in his family. It is all this pain pent up within his heart that has forced him to become a writer. It was during his stay in Nagpur in 1968–1969 that he came in close contact with Dalit people and the Dalit literary movement in Maharashtra that changed the course of his life as a litterateur.

Manohar Mouli Biswas is a legend in his own right. He is the current President of Bangla Dalit Sahitya Sanstha. He has been editing the pioneering bi-monthly literary magazine Dalit Mirror in English for more than a decade. The magazine upholds the cause of the Dalits in Bengal. He has written four volumes of poems, one collection of short story, seven books of essays and an autobiography entitled Amar Bhubaney Ami Benche Thaki (2013) which is later translated by Angana Dutta and Jaydeep Sarangi and published as Surviving in My World : Growing Up Dalit in Bengal (2015). This translated autobiography has earned national and global reputation and has been enlisted into the syllabus of different universities. Jaydeep[ Sarangi has edited a collection of essays on him, "Bangla Dalit Writer Writes Back" (2019)

Poems in translation
His poems are translated widely from Bangla into English and into other languages. His translated poems are gradually attracted by the wide-readers, and have come into the scholastic discussions. A Rose of Revolt: Two Poems in Bengali by: Manohar Mouli Biswas –

 

- translated by Jaydeep Sarangi

List of works

Poetry collections

 Ora Amar Kabita (8 May 1985), Dipali Book House, Kolkata, West Bengal 
 Tarer Kanna : Titiksha (31 December 1987), J/3 Tangra Govt. Housing Estate; distributed by Aditya Prakashalaya, Kolkata, West Bengal 
 Vivikto Uthaney Ghar (June 1991), J/3 Tangra Housing Estate; distributed by Dipali Book House, Kolkata, West Bengal
 Poetic Rendering As Yet Unborn, (Translation of Bangla poetry in English) (2010), published by Shubhra Biswas in Calcutta Book Fair 2010, Kolkata, West Bengal, 
 Bikshata Kaler Banshi (16 August 2013), Chaturtha Dunia, Stall22 Bhabani Dutta Lane, Kolkata, West Bengal, 
 The Wheel Will Turn (Translation of Bangla poetry in English) (2014), Cyberwit.net, Allahabad, India,

Short story
 Krishna Mrittikar Manoosh(8 May 1988), published by Satyabrata Majumdar; distributed by Nirmal Book Agency, Kolkata, West Bengal

Autobiography
 Amar Bhubaney Ami Benche Thaki (13 June 2013), Chaturtha Dunia, Kolkata 
 Surviving in My World : Growing Up Dalit in Bengal (2015), Stree

Essays
 Dalit Sahityer Digboloy (1992), J/3 Tangra Govt. Housing Estate; distributed by Dr. Ambedkar Prakashani, Dalua, Garia, South 24 Parganas, West Bengal
 Yuktivadi Bharatbarsha : Ekti Aitihyer Sandhan (1998), Chaturtha Dunia, Kolkata, 
 Vonnochokhe Prabandha Mala (14 April 2003), Chaturtha Dunia, Kolkata 
 Dalit Sahityer Ruparekha (February 2007), Bani Silpa, Kolkata
 Prabandhe Prantajan Authoba Asprisher Diary (January 2010), Chaturtha Dunia, Kolkata, 
 An Interpretation of Dalit Literature, Aesthetic, Theory and Movements : Through the Lens of Ambedkarism (January 2017), published by Shubhra Biswas on behalf of Bangla Dalit Sahitya Sanstha, and Chaturtha Dunia, Kolkata,

Edited books
 Adwaita Malla Barman : Ekti Sahityik Pratishrot (1995), Chaturtha Duniua, Kolkata
 Shatobarsher Bangla Dalit Sahitya: Bangla Dalit Writings from 1911–2010 (26 January 2011), Chaturtha Dunia, Kolkata, 
 Chaturtha Duniar Galpa (2005), Chaturtha Dunia, Kolkata 
 Krishna Chandra Thakur (Kesto Sadhu): Smriti Sambhar (1999), Chaturtha Dunia, Kolkata 
 Anya Bhashar Dalit Kabita (September 1994), Chaturtha Dunia, Kolkata

Magazine/editorial
 Dalit Mirror (Govt. of India Registration no 71031/97),

See also 
Dalit Literature

References 

1943 births
Living people
Writers from West Bengal
Bengali writers
20th-century Indian poets
20th-century Indian essayists
Dalit writers
21st-century Indian essayists
21st-century Indian poets
20th-century Indian short story writers
20th-century Indian male writers
21st-century Indian male writers